Hemihydranencephaly is a severe cephalic disorder characterized by complete or almost complete absence of the cerebral cortex with preservation of meninges, basal ganglia, pons, medulla, cerebellum, and falx.  It is a special type of hydranencephaly.

It is a very rare disease. As it stands, only 7 cases have been reported.

References
 Greco F, Finocchiaro M, Pavone P, Trifiletti RR, Parano E. Hemihydranencephaly: case report and literature review. J Child Neurol. 2001;16 :218–221

Congenital disorders of nervous system
Rare diseases